GS-15 may refer to:

General Schedule (US civil service pay scale)
Geobacter